You Am I is a 2006 Lithuanian romance film directed by Kristijonas Vildžiūnas. It was screened in the Un Certain Regard section at the 2006 Cannes Film Festival.

Cast
 Andrius Bialobzeskis - Baronas
 Jurga Jutaite - Dominyka
 Renata Veberyte Loman
 Mykolas Vildziunas
 Daiva Jovaisiene

References

External links

2006 films
2000s romance films
Lithuanian-language films
Lithuanian drama films